Southern Michigan is a loosely defined geographic area of the U.S. state of Michigan. Southern Michigan may be referred to as a sub-region or component area to other regions of the Lower Peninsula of Michigan. It is an area of rolling farmland, including the Irish Hills. It is usually defined as anywhere less than approximately 45-50 miles North of Ohio/Indiana border, it can also be defined as the bottom 2 counties of Michigan, meaning the county which borders Ohio/Indiana and the county just north of that. The region shares a state border with Indiana and Ohio. However the actual line is somewhat disputed.

Definitions
Depending on the viewer's perspective, the area known as Southern Michigan can fall into three well defined and larger regions of the state:

 Central Michigan the Greater Lansing and the Flint and Tri-Cities area.
 West Michigan the area surrounding Kalamazoo and Battle Creek, which share similarities with other cities in Michiana and on the Lake Michigan shore.
 Southeast Michigan includes Metro Detroit and outlying cities such as Ann Arbor, Adrian, and Jackson, though Jackson is normally included in "South-Central Lower Michigan" or "Mid-Michigan."

See also
List of counties in Michigan
Mid or Central Michigan
West Michigan
Southeastern Michigan
Lower Peninsula of Michigan
Lansing metropolitan area

Notes

External links
 Clarke Historical Library, Central Michigan University, Bibliography on Michigan (arranged by counties and regions)
 Michigan Geology -- Clarke Historical Library, Central Michigan University.
 Michigan Department of Natural Resources website, harbors, hunting, resources and more.
 Info Michigan, detailed information on 630 cities
 List of Museums, other attractions compiled by state government.
 Michigan's Official Economic Development and Travel Site.
 
 Map of Michigan Lighthouse in PDF Format.

Regions of Michigan